Roth is an electoral constituency (German: Wahlkreis) represented in the Bundestag. It elects one member via first-past-the-post voting. Under the current constituency numbering system, it is designated as constituency 246. It is located in northern Bavaria, comprising the districts of Nürnberger Land and Roth.

Roth was created for the 1976 federal election. Since 2021, it has been represented by Ralph Edelhäußer of the Christian Social Union (CSU).

Geography
Roth is located in northern Bavaria. As of the 2021 federal election, it comprises the districts of Nürnberger Land and Roth.

History
Roth was created in 1976. In the 1976 through 1998 elections, it was constituency 232 in the numbering system. In the 2002 and 2005 elections, it was number 247. Since the 2009 election, it has been number 246.

Originally, the constituency comprised the independent city of Schwabach and the districts of Roth and Weißenburg-Gunzenhausen. It acquired its current borders in the 1990 election.

Members
The constituency has been held continuously by the Christian Social Union (CSU) since its creation. It was first represented by Richard Stücklen from 1976 to 1990, followed by Hansgeorg Hauser from 1990 to 2002. Marlene Mortler served as representative from 2002 to 2019, when she resigned to sit in the European Parliament. She was succeeded by Ralph Edelhäußer in 2021.

Election results

2021 election

2017 election

2013 election

2009 election

References

Federal electoral districts in Bavaria
1976 establishments in West Germany
Constituencies established in 1976
Nürnberger Land
Roth (district)